The 1946 Wofford Terriers football team represented Wofford College as a member of the South Carolina Little Four during the 1946 college football season. In their first and only season under head coach Ted Petoskey, the Terriers compiled 1–8 record and failed to score a point in the first five games of the season.

Schedule

References

Wofford
Wofford Terriers football seasons
Wofford Terriers football